Great Marlow School is a co-educational secondary school in Marlow, Buckinghamshire. It takes children from the age of 11 through to the age of 18 and has approximately 1,260 pupils. In August 2011 the school became an Academy. In 2012/2013 the school underwent a building project to erect a new sports hall, all weather astroturf pitches, new bus parking and a community gym complex. The school   sold a large plot of land at the top of their field to fund this project.

In September 2005 the school was awarded specialist school status as a technology college, by the Department for Education and Skills (DfES).

Pupils who attend the school normally live in the Marlow or the surrounding villages such as Lane End.

Sport
The School has an active rowing club called the Great Marlow School Boat Club which is affiliated to British Rowing.

Notable alumni

 Elliot Benyon, footballer
 Julian Dutton, comedian
 Tyrrell Hatton, professional golfer
 Travis Ludlow (born 2003), English aviator
 Steve Redgrave, rower
 Danny Senda, footballer

The Voice
The Voice is a newsletter that is given at the end of every term giving news about the school.

References 

1961 establishments in England
Academies in Buckinghamshire
Educational institutions established in 1961
Marlow, Buckinghamshire
Secondary schools in Buckinghamshire